Josef Kalt (later Kalt-Arnet, 20 September 1920 – 21 February 2012) was a Swiss rower who competed in the 1948 Summer Olympics.

In 1948 he won the silver medal with his brother Hans Kalt in the coxless pair event.

References

1920 births
2012 deaths
Swiss male rowers
Olympic rowers of Switzerland
Rowers at the 1948 Summer Olympics
Olympic silver medalists for Switzerland
Olympic medalists in rowing
Medalists at the 1948 Summer Olympics
20th-century Swiss people